The 14th Lambda Literary Awards were held in 2002 to honour works of LGBT literature published in 2001.

Nominees and winners

External links
 14th Lambda Literary Awards

Lambda Literary Awards
Lambda
Lists of LGBT-related award winners and nominees
2002 in LGBT history
2002 awards in the United States